Louis Puech (1 May 1851, in Gavernac, Bozouls, Aveyron – 15 July 1947, in Aubignac, Aveyron) was a député of the French Third Republic and Minister of Public Works in the second government of Aristide Briand from 3 November 1910 to 24 February 1911.  During his 30 years in office he was inscribed with the group of Républicains de gauche. He was the brother of the sculptor Denys Puech, director of the Villa Médicis (1921–33).

Life
A lawyer by profession, he was noted for pleading in several varied political affairs, notably those of the grévistes of Decazeville (also known as the Watrin affair) and the anarchists Monod and Lucas.

Conseiller municipal for Paris between 1893 and 1898 and a député for the Seine (3rd arrondissement of Paris) from 1898 to 1932, he was known for having denounced the poor care and pitiable monitoring of the archives for France's colonial African administrations, revealing he was in possession of originals which should never have left Africa. His action forced the then Minister for the Colonies to review the organisation of the archives in French West Africa.

He was Minister of Public Works, Posts and Telegraphs from 3 November 1910 to 27 February 1911.

References

Sources

1852 births
1947 deaths
People from Aveyron
Politicians from Occitania (administrative region)
Radical Party (France) politicians
Democratic Republican Alliance politicians
French Ministers of Public Works, Posts and Telegraphs
Transport ministers of France
Members of the 7th Chamber of Deputies of the French Third Republic
Members of the 8th Chamber of Deputies of the French Third Republic
Members of the 9th Chamber of Deputies of the French Third Republic
Members of the 10th Chamber of Deputies of the French Third Republic
Members of the 11th Chamber of Deputies of the French Third Republic
Members of the 12th Chamber of Deputies of the French Third Republic
Members of the 13th Chamber of Deputies of the French Third Republic
Members of the 14th Chamber of Deputies of the French Third Republic
19th-century French lawyers